Tarumã is a municipality in the state of São Paulo in Brazil. It was founded in October 20, 1927 and has a population of 15,183. Is 455 km away from the capital, São Paulo.

The town has an annual average temperature of 23,1 °C and the vegetation predominates Mata Atlântica and Cerrado, is then a transition zone of vegetation. Its Human Development Index (HDI) in 2010 was 0.775.

In 2010, it occupied the 20th place in the ranking of the 100 best cities to live in Brazil and the placement of 19th place in the ranking of best cities in the state of São Paulo, according to the Municipal Development Index Firjan.

History
Tarumã started as a village called Vila Lex (Lex Village), named for its founder Gilberto Lex, a German immigrant who arrived in Brazil in 1825. Its present name comes from a Tupi–Guarani word for the indigenous fruit tree Vitex montevidensis.

The town was elevated to District of Peace in 1927, and to municipality status in 1993. The first mayor of the municipality was Oscar Gozzi.

Government

Mayor: Oscar Gozzi (2017–2020)

References 

Municipalities in São Paulo (state)
1927 establishments in Brazil